Tom Benny Lund (November 26, 1944 – October 16, 2000) was a Danish handball player who competed in the 1972 Summer Olympics.

He played his club handball with Efterslægten. In 1972 he was part of the Danish team which finished thirteenth in the Olympic tournament. He played four matches and scored six goals.

External links
Tom Lund's profile at Sports Reference.com

1944 births
2000 deaths
Danish male handball players
Olympic handball players of Denmark
Handball players at the 1972 Summer Olympics